You Exist is a 1993 Russian-French drama film directed by Vladimir Makeranets.

Plot 
The film tells about a woman Anna, whose husband died, and her son became the meaning of her life. Suddenly he brings home the beautiful girl Ira and says that they were married, which makes Anna jealous and fear of losing him. Lovers leave home, leaving Anna alone.

Cast 
 Anna Kamenkova
 Vadim Lyubshin
 Inga Ilm
 Regimantas Adomaitis	
 Tatyana Lyutaeva
 Natalya Kovalyova		
 Natalya Potapova	
 Ivan Krasko
 A. Gavrilov
 D. Makeranets

References

External links 
 

1993 films
1990s Russian-language films
Russian drama films
1993 drama films
French drama films
1990s French films